Claude Auclair (1 May 1943 – 20 January 1990) was a French cartoonist. He is best known for Simon du Fleuve.

1943 births
1990 deaths
French ecologists
French comics writers
French comics artists